In war, a chamade was a certain beat of a drum, or sound of a trumpet, which was addressed to the enemy as a kind of signal, to inform them of some proposition to be made to the commander; either to capitulate, to have leave to bury their dead, make a truce, etc. Gilles Ménage derives the word from the Italian chiamate, from Latin clamare, to call.

See also

References

Law of war
Military diplomacy
Military music history